Iqbal Arshad is an American engineer, inventor, speaker and technology executive. He has served as the senior vice president of engineering and global product development at Motorola Mobility, Google and Lenovo, and has been responsible for design and development of industry-leading smartphones, tablets smartwatches, wearables, silicon, and mobile computing technologies.

Education
Arshad holds a B.S. in electrical engineering from University of Miami, and a master's degree in Engineering Management (MEM) from Northwestern University.

Career
Arshad re-joined Motorola in 2003 to lead product development and management. He led design & development of the first CDMA variants of the RAZR and RAZR 2 product lines, the first DROID smartphone, the first Android Tablet (Xoom) featuring the Honeycomb (Android 3.1) OS, the first dual-core, dual-OS smartphone (Atrix 4G), and led 4G LTE silicon and software.

In 2012 Motorola Mobility was acquired by Google. Iqbal was chosen as part of the senior leadership team under CEO Dennis Woodside during the acquisition. Under Google, he led the Moto X, Moto G, and Moto 360 products. He also launched the Nexus 6 in collaboration with Google.

In 2014, Lenovo acquired Motorola from Google. Arshad continued to lead Engineering & Product Development for both Motorola in the US and Lenovo MBG (Mobile Business Group) in China. Arshad's team engineered and shipped Droid Turbo 2 (world's first shatterproof display), the modular Moto Z, a collection of Moto Mods, and a Moto Mod developer kit for 3rd parties.

Awards, speeches, and public service

In 2010, Arshad was recognized by Crain's Chicago in their annual 40 under 40 list. He serves on the advisory board for Northwestern University's Master of Engineering Management, and is a member of the IEEE. He previously served on the Illinois Innovation Council.

Arshad has had several public speaking engagements, including a presentation during Northwestern Engineering's ‘Design:Chicago 2014’ event, and as the 2014 commencement speaker for Northwestern University's McCormick School of Engineering.

References 

Living people
Motorola employees
Google employees
Lenovo
Northwestern University alumni
University of Miami College of Engineering alumni
Businesspeople from Chicago
Year of birth missing (living people)